The United States Department of Defense acknowledges holding two United Arab Emirates captives in Guantanamo.
A total of 779 captives have been held in extrajudicial detention in the Guantanamo Bay detention camps, in Cuba since the camps opened on January 11, 2002,
The camp population peaked in 2004 at approximately 660.  Only nineteen new captives, all "high value detainees" have been transferred there since the United States Supreme Court's ruling in Rasul v. Bush.  As of January 2008 the camp population stand at approximately 285.

Following the Department of Defenses' publication of official lists of captives' names, officials in Abu Dhabi confirmed that Abdulah Al Hamiri is a UAE citizen. The second, "Muieen Al-deen Jamal Al-deen Abd Al-Fusal Abd Al-Sattar", may have been born in Dubai but is not Emirati. The latter name may be a nom de guerre; it is Arabic for "From religion, beauty. Religion: chapter's servant, curtain's servant." According to The Daily Telegraph, he is an ethnic Rohingya Burmese who was born in Dubai, has a Pakistani passport, and lived in Mecca, Saudi Arabia most of his life, where he taught religion at a private school.

United Arab Emirates captives acknowledged by the DoD

References

Emirati
Emirati prisoners and detainees
United Arab Emirates–United States relations